The San Lazaro Leisure Park, officially known as the San Lazaro Leisure and Business Park is a mixed-used venue which features a racetrack in Carmona, Cavite, Philippines. It is the home of the Manila Jockey Club.

The leisure park occupies a land  and houses around 1,000 thoroughbreds as of 2015. Pagcor operates a Casino within the area. It also houses a small venue inside the turf building, for cockfighting. The venue hosts a casino and is planned to be the site of the National Teams Training Centre to be used by both the national men's and women's football team. Within the grounds of the leisure park venues to accommodate baseball, football, and wakeboarding are being built. A concert venue is also planned.

History

The Manila Jockey Club used to be housed at the San Lázaro Hippodrome in 1912 in Manila. The racetrack was built on the  former friar estate known during the Spanish colonial period as the Hacienda de Mayhaligue. It later came to be the known as the Hacienda de San Lázaro being home to the Hospital de San Lázaro for lepers administered by the Franciscans since 1785. The site itself was the location of the Real Monasterio de Santa Clara, which the Manila Jockey Club purchased during the early days of the American colonial period in 1900. Prior to the construction of the hippodrome at San Lázaro, the Club held its races at the Santa Mesa Hippodrome in Santa Mesa. The Club then transferred its racetrack to its present site in Cavite in 2003. The former site was converted into a mixed-used development under the name, San Lazaro Tourism and Business Park.

Recent developments
Among the newest projects inside the SLLP is the construction of the new grand cockpit of MJC's subdiary, Manila Cockers Club (MCC), the 2,000-seater MCC Coliseum.

See also
Manila Jockey Club
PFF National Training Centre

References

Horse racing venues in the Philippines
Sports in Cavite
Horse racing in the Philippines
Buildings and structures in Cavite
2003 establishments in the Philippines
Sports complexes in the Philippines